In anatomy, the urogenital hiatus is the structure through which the urethra and the vagina pass. It is located in the anterior (front) of the pelvic floor. The pelvic floor has two hiatuses (gaps). The other is the more posterior 'rectal hiatus', through which the anal canal pass.

Function
The urogenital hiatus allows the vagina and urethra to pass through the pelvic floor muscles.

Clinical significance
The urogenital hiatus has been linked to urinary stress incontinence.

See also
 Coccyx (tailbone)
 Pubococcygeus muscle
 Pelvic floor dysfunction
 Perineology
 Perineal hernia
 Female genital prolapse

References

Sexual anatomy
Muscles of the torso
Women's health